The Casual Vacancy is a 2015 British miniseries based on the 2012 novel of the same title by J. K. Rowling. Directed by Jonny Campbell and written by Sarah Phelps, the series premiered on 15 February 2015 on BBC One in the United Kingdom and on 29 April 2015 on HBO in the United States.

Cast 

Rory Kinnear as Barry Fairbrother
Emily Bevan as Mary Fairbrother
Michael Gambon as Howard Mollison
Julia McKenzie as Shirley Mollison
Rufus Jones as Miles Mollison
Keeley Hawes as Samantha Mollison
Hetty Baynes as Maureen Lowe
Abigail Lawrie as Krystal Weedon
Keeley Forsyth as Terri Weedon
Simon McBurney as Colin 'Cubby' Wall
Monica Dolan as Tess Wall
Brian Vernel as Stuart 'Fats' Wall
Richard Glover as Simon Price
Marie Critchley as Ruth Price
Joe Hurst as Andrew 'Arf' Price
Michele Austin as Kay Bawden
Lolita Chakrabarti as Parminder Jawanda
Silas Carson as Vikram Jawanda
Ria Choony as Sukhvinder Jawanda
Simona Brown as Gaia Bawden
Julian Wadham as Aubrey Sweetlove
Emilia Fox as Julia Sweetlove

Production 
The miniseries was announced on 3 December 2012. It was commissioned from The Blair Partnership who represent J. K. Rowling. The series was produced through an independent production company operated by Neil Blair and Rick Senat (who were executive producers of the series), on behalf of The Blair Partnership. The deal was struck following discussions between Blair and BBC One Controller Danny Cohen. J. K. Rowling was to collaborate closely with the project, with the number and length of the episodes then still to be decided.

On 12 September 2013, Warner Bros. announced that it will serve as the worldwide TV distributor of the series, except in the United Kingdom.

After a year and a half without news on the production itself, casting was announced in June 2014. Filming began in August 2014 in the Gloucestershire towns of Painswick, Bisley, Northleach and Minchinhampton, Dauntsey, and in the city of Bristol and at Archway School.

British band Solomon Grey composed the music for the series, which heavily features tracks from their 2015 album Selected Works, along with original songs.

Episodes

Critical reception 
The critical response to the opening episode was mostly positive. In a particularly praise-filled review for Digital Spy, Cameron McKewan described the series as having a "perfect cast with a biting script". He summarised: "It's a cracking first instalment for the three-part series with bountiful characters to take in, and the relationships not clearly defined from the outset (rewardingly so)" In a review for The Guardian, Stuart Jeffries also gave a positive response, whilst describing the series as "The Archers meets Benefit Street" Comparing the TV adaptation more positively than the novel itself, Gerard O'Donovan, in a review for The Telegraph, awarded the series opener 4 out of 5 stars. He optimistically summarised: "...the performances are uniformly good, the direction is inventive, and there's an undeniable topicality and panache to this adaptation that convinces you that just around the corner something will pull it all together and make it succeed." Ellen E Jones, writing for The Independent, took a similar approach with review title: "JK Rowling's story is a far better drama than it is a book"

Elsewhere, however, reception to the series opening episode was less favourable. Grace Dent of The Independent said that "it was odd to read reports that the show was attacking the middle classes and glorifying 'the noble savage'. It was glaringly clear, to me at least, from Phelps' script that while Michael Gambon's character Howard Mollison was indeed a terrible snob, we could hardly disagree that the 'feral' kids wiping bogeys down his deli window were spoiling village ambience. These were difficult notions of 'village life' – the junkies, the domestic abusers, the shark-like property developers, the upwardly mobiles, [and] the downwardly spiralling – and I applaud Rowling and Phelps for picking at them."

References

External links 
 – official website

2015 British television series debuts
2015 British television series endings
2010s British drama television series
2010s British television miniseries
BBC television dramas
Television shows based on British novels
English-language television shows
Television shows set in Gloucestershire
Television series by Warner Bros. Television Studios
Adaptations of works by J. K. Rowling